The Scottish Prison Service (SPS) is an executive agency of the Scottish Government tasked with managing prisons and Young Offender Institutions.

The Chief Executive of the Scottish Prison Service, currently Teresa Medhurst, is responsible for its administration and reports to the Cabinet Secretary for Justice, who is responsible for the Scottish Prison Service within the Scottish Government.

There are fifteen prison establishments in the country, two of which are privately managed. The SPS employs over 4,000 staff, with its headquarters in Calton House, located in South Gyle, Edinburgh.

Key personnel
The current Chief Executive is Teresa Medhurst and supporting her is the SPS Board consisting of:

 Allister Purdie - Director of Operations (Acting)
 Caroline Johnston  - Director of Corporate Services (Acting) 
 Sue Brookes - Interim Director of Strategy & Engagement (Acting)

List of establishments 
 HMP Addiewell (Privately run by Sodexo)
 HMP Barlinnie
 HMP Castle Huntly (Open prison)
 HMP & YOI Cornton Vale (Young Offenders Institution and Women's Prison)
 HMP Dumfries
 HMP Edinburgh
 HMP Glenochil
 HMP & YOI Grampian (Young Offenders Institution)
 HMP Greenock
 HMP Inverness
 HMP Kilmarnock (Operated by Serco as part of a public-private partnership scheme)
 HMP Low Moss
 HMP Perth
 HMYOI Polmont (Young Offenders Institution)
 HMP Shotts

HMP Addiewell and HMP Kilmarnock are both privately managed under contract to the SPS.

Other responsibilities

Prisoner escorting
In November 2003 SPS signed a contract on behalf of Scottish Ministers for a "Prisoner Escort and Court Custody Service". This contract with Geoamey provides for all prisoner escorting between police cells, court, prisons and hospitals as well as covering escorts from prison such as funerals, hospital appointments and community placements and also operating the court custody units. In 2012, SPS contracted this service out to G4S then onto Geoamey in 2018.

Secure hospital 
Some prisoners are detained in a secure psychiatric hospital. This is run by the Scottish National Health Service rather than the SPS. 
 State Hospital, Carstairs, South Lanarkshire

Prison aftercare
An aftercare scheme, Throughcare, has significantly cut reoffending.  The scheme involves getting released prisoners a roof over their heads, sorting out their benefits and medical needs, and showing them that someone cares about them.  78% of former prisoners who received Throughcare did not return to prison over two years.  Eleven Scottish prison service sites use Throughcare. "The TSOs [Throughcare Support Officers] use a case management approach, working collaboratively with the prisoner, their family, statutory and third sector service partners, to discuss appropriate support provision and to develop a personalised plan to support the person during their transition from custody back in to the community."

Media coverage
The SPS has been featured in many TV shows including Prison: First & Last 24 Hours on Sky One which was broadcast between 28 October 2015 and 5 December 2016.

See also

 His Majesty's Chief Inspector of Prisons for Scotland
 His Majesty's Prison Service
 List of United Kingdom prisons
 Northern Ireland Prison Service
 Prison categories in the United Kingdom
 Scottish Courts and Tribunals Service
 United Kingdom prison population
 Young offender

References

External links 
 

 
 
Prison Service
Prison and correctional agencies
Prisons
Organisations based in Edinburgh
1993 in Scotland
1993 in British law
Government agencies established in 1993